Turkey Mountain Urban Wilderness Area is a  area of undeveloped land that stretches from I-44 to 71st Street in Tulsa in the US state of Oklahoma. It is managed by the Tulsa River Parks Authority and open to the public. The main entrance to the wilderness area is at 67th Street and Elwood Avenue in West Tulsa.

Turkey Mountain 

Turkey Mountain is a hill occupying a wide area on the west side of the Arkansas River in Tulsa, Oklahoma.

Trails 
The 25 mile long River Parks paved trail passes through the Turkey Mountain Wilderness Area, close to the river, connecting the area to other river side parks in Tulsa.

In June 2016, the National Park Service designated the Turkey Mountain trails as part of the National Recreation Trail system.

Claimed petroglyphs 
Close to the river there are several markings in the stone, one of which has been claimed to be the letters "gwn" (claimed to mean fair or white hair). These were believed by writer Barry Fell to be petroglyphs left by pre-Columbian European travelers. The idea of Pre-Columbian trans-oceanic contact by Europeans, apart from the Vikings in Newfoundland, is considered a fringe theory or pseudoarchaeology.

References

External links
 Official web site

Geography of Tulsa, Oklahoma
Hills of Oklahoma
Protected areas of Tulsa County, Oklahoma
Tourist attractions in Tulsa, Oklahoma
Pseudoarchaeology